Wolfpit Run is a  long 1st order tributary to Aarons Creek in Halifax County, Virginia.

Course 
Wolfpit Run rises about 3 miles south of Virgilina, Virginia in Granville County, North Carolina, and then flows northeast to join Aarons Creek about 2 miles east of Virgilina.

Watershed 
Wolfpit Run drains  of area, receives about 45.7 in/year of precipitation, has a wetness index of 420.01, and is about 52% forested.

See also 
 List of Virginia Rivers

References 

Rivers of North Carolina
Rivers of Virginia
Rivers of Granville County, North Carolina
Rivers of Halifax County, Virginia
Tributaries of the Roanoke River